Events in the year 2017 in Bulgaria.

Incumbents
 President: Rosen Plevneliev (until 22 January); Rumen Radev
 Prime Minister: Boyko Borisov (until 27 January); Ognyan Gerdzhikov

Events
22 January – Rumen Radev took over as President
27 January – Ognyan Gerdzhikov took over as Prime Minister

Deaths

25 January – Ivan Pritargov, footballer (b. 1952).
27 January – Atanas Kirov, weightlifter, three times world champion (b. 1946).
29 January – Boris Nikolov, boxer and Olympic bronze medalist (b. 1929).

15 June – Rumen Nenov, footballer (b. 1969)

References

 
2010s in Bulgaria
Bulgaria
Bulgaria